Serhiy Bohdanovych Maherovych (born 28 August 1975) is a retired Ukrainian professional football player. player currently playing for SV Babelsberg 03.

Career 
Moherevych began his career with FC Krystal Chortkiv. Also played for FC CSKA Kyiv and FC Prykarpattya Ivano-Frankivsk. Later he moved to VfB 1906 Sangerhausen.

References

External links
 

1975 births
Living people
Ukrainian footballers
FC CSKA Kyiv players
FC Spartak Ivano-Frankivsk players
Expatriate footballers in Germany
Association football midfielders